Deogracias Victor "DV" Barbers Savellano (born November 25, 1959) is a Filipino politician who last served as a member of the House of Representatives for Ilocos Sur's 1st district from 2016 to 2022. He was also one of the Deputy Speakers of the House of Representatives from 2019 to 2022.

Education and personal life
Savellano was born in Cabugao, Ilocos Sur in 1959. He is the son of Virginia Barbers, and the former Mayor of Cabugao and former Chairman of the Commission on Elections (COMELEC) Victorino Savellano. His sister, Reina, operates Victorino's Restaurant in Quezon City, along with Heny Sison.

He earned a bachelor's degree in economics at University of the Philippines. He also studied at California, United States, where he obtained his master's degree.

He married actress Dina Bonnevie in 2012 and the stepfather of Danica Sotto-Pingris and Oyo Boy Sotto. Both of them met each other in a film Hanggang Saan, Hanggang Kailan in 1991.

Political career
Savellano entered politics as the Vice Mayor of Cabugao from 1981 to 1987. He was also the 2-term Governor of Ilocos Sur in 1992, as well as from 2001 to 2004 and again from 2007 to 2010. He also served as the Vice Governor of the same province from 1988 to 1992, and again from 2010 to 2016.

He was first elected a member of the House of Representatives for Ilocos Sur's 1st congressional district in the 2016 election. He was re-elected in 2019. He was defeated by Ronald Singson in 2022 election, Singson received 99,376 votes while Savellano received 73,503 votes.

On 13 August 2019, Savellano was appointed one of the Deputy Speakers of the House of Representatives.

Controversy
In October 2013, Savellano was charged for corruption allegations, along with Luis Singson, who also served as the Governor of Ilocos Sur. Both of them were harshly criticised for reallocation of the usage of public funds for undefined projects, which is the breach of Republic Act No. 3019.

On July 10, 2020, Savellano is one of the 70 representatives who voted to "yes" to deny the franchise renewal of ABS-CBN.

References

External links
 Deogracias Victor Savellano on Facebook

1959 births
Living people
Members of the House of Representatives of the Philippines from Ilocos Sur
Deputy Speakers of the House of Representatives of the Philippines
Governors of Ilocos Sur
People from Ilocos Sur
University of the Philippines alumni
Nacionalista Party politicians